Ahmad Al Khaled Al Sabah is a Kuwaiti politician and the former lieutenant general in the Kuwaiti Armed Forces. He served as deputy prime minister and minister of defense of Kuwait from 2012 to 2013.

Early life
Ahmad Al Sabah is the son of Khaled Al Hamad Al Sabah and Mouza Al Ahmad Al Sabah, a daughter of Ahmad Al-Jaber Al-Sabah, who was the 10th ruler of Kuwait from 1921 to 1950. He is the brother of Mohammad Al Khalid Al Sabah, former deputy prime minister and interior minister of Kuwait. His other brother, Sabah Al Khalid Al Sabah, served as prime minister.

Career
Sabah is a military officer with the rank of lieutenant general. He was appointed as the 7th chief of general staff of the Kuwaiti Armed Forces in January 2010.

He was appointed as deputy prime minister and minister of defense on 14 February 2012 as part of the cabinet led by Prime Minister Jaber Al Mubarak Al Sabah. Ahmad Al Sabah's tenure ended on 4 August 2013 when Khaled Al Jarrah Al Sabah was appointed both deputy prime minister and minister of defense.

References

Defence ministers of Kuwait
Government ministers of Kuwait
Ahmad Al Khalid Al Sabah
Living people
Year of birth missing (living people)